Tru Blu Beverages is an Australian soft drink producer. 1 in 6 beverages purchased by Australian consumers through supermarkets is made by Tru Blu Beverages. Employing 400 people nationally, they are an important manufacturer in the Australian business sector, and are the No. 3 non-alcoholic, non-dairy beverage manufacturer in Australia. The beverages are sold nationally through leading supermarkets (Coles, Woolworths, IGA), corner stores, petrol and convenience outlets. The company has state of the art factories in 3 states and offices in each major capital city.

In 2011, Asahi Holdings (Australia) Pty Ltd acquired P&N Beverages Australia Pty Ltd, simultaneously divesting the cordial and carbonated soft drink business of P&N to the newly established Tru Blu Beverages Pty Ltd, and retained the water and fruit juice business of P&N. They produce over 20 brands across soft drink, cordial, sparkling mineral water and energy drinks. Below is a list of some of the brands produced and sold by Tru Blu Beverages:

LA ICE, LA maxi ICE, Diet Rite, Tiger Ginger Beer, Glee, Capri, Waterfords Lite & Fruity, Wicked, Yankee Root Beer, McSars, Ceda Creaming Soda, Lido Lemonade, Juicee, Club Dry Ginger, Pub Squash, Brewers Choice Ginger Beer, Passion Crush 

Woolworths
 La Ice Cola Original & La Maxi Ice Cola 2L
 Diet Rite Soft Drink No Sugar Ginger Beer, Passionfruit, Apple Crisp & Portello 1.25L
 Pub Squash Lemon Soda Squash 1.25L
 Ceda Lime Creaming Soda 1.25L
 Ceda Vanilla Creaming Soda 1.25L
 Ceda Classic Creaming Soda 1.25L
 Diet Rite Cordial Apple Raspberry, Lime, Multi Fruits, Apple Blackcurrant, Fruit Cocktail, Lemon Lime 1L
 Waterfords Lite & Fruity Apple Berry, Lemon Lime Bitters, Orange Passion, Blackcurrant & Tahitian Lime 1L
 Waterfords Lite & Fruity Lemon Lime Bitters & Tahitian Lime 4 Pack 250ml

Coles
 FruitCo Orange +, Apple Pear +, Grape +,10 Fruits +, Apple Mango Banana +, Apricot Nectar +, Apple + & Tomato + 2L
 Que Cola Original, Cola No Sugar 1.25L
 Que Cola Can 12 Pack 375ml
 Que Cola Can 6 Pack 200ml
 La Ice Cola Original & La Ice Cola No Sugar 2L
 Viva Cordial Lime, Fruit Cup & Raspberry 2L
 Diet Rite Cordial Apple Raspberry, Lemon, Strawberry Guaya, Fruit Cocktail 1L
 Waterfords Lite & Fruity Apple Berry, Lemon Lime Bitters & Tahitian Lime 1L

Their head office is located in Condell Park, a suburb in Sydney, NSW.

See also

 List of brand name soft drinks products
 List of soft drink flavors
 List of soft drinks by country

References

External links

Drink companies of Australia
Australian companies established in 2011
2011 establishments in Australia
Asahi Breweries
Food and drink companies established in 2011